Tell Township is a township in Huntingdon County, Pennsylvania, United States. The population was 662 at the 2010 census.

Geography
According to the United States Census Bureau, the township has a total area of 42.5 square miles (110.2 km), all  land.

Demographics

As of the census of 2000, there were 648 people, 238 households, and 179 families residing in the township.  The population density was 15.2 people per square mile (5.9/km).  There were 343 housing units at an average density of 8.1/sq mi (3.1/km).  The racial make-up of the township was 100.00% White.

There were 238 households, out of which 36.1% had children under the age of 18 living with them, 64.3% were married couples living together, 7.6% had a female householder with no husband present, and 24.4% were non-families. 23.5% of all households were made up of individuals, and 11.3% had someone living alone who was 65 years of age or older.  The average household size was 2.70 and the average family size was 3.17.

In the township the population was spread out, with 25.9% under the age of 18, 8.8% from 18 to 24, 30.2% from 25 to 44, 21.5% from 45 to 64, and 13.6% who were 65 years of age or older.  The median age was 36 years. For every 100 females, there were 98.8 males.  For every 100 females age 18 and over, there were 100.0 males.

The median income for a household in the township was $32,679, and the median income for a family was $39,444. Males had a median income of $34,444 versus $19,375 for females. The per capita income for the township was $15,832.  About 3.9% of families and 8.5% of the population were below the poverty line, including 13.9% of those under age 18 and 9.0% of those age 65 or over.

References

External links

Townships in Huntingdon County, Pennsylvania
Townships in Pennsylvania